Piper Mackenzie Harris is an American former child actress and model. She is most famous for her role in the 2009 film G-Force, in which she plays Penny Goodman, a little girl who takes home one of the guinea pigs in the film. Piper is also known for her appearance on iCarly as the Crying Sunshine Girl and also for many television guest appearances on popular series including Big Bang Theory and Modern Family.

Career
Harris was born in Texas and started modeling at the age of three. She has appeared in television series, film projects, commercials and print ads. One of her roles was in the Nickelodeon sitcom iCarly, where she played the daughter of Spencer Shay's love interest, Emily Millford. Harris is also known for her role in the film G-Force. She had a role in Blonde Ambition, starring Jessica Simpson. She also had a small role in the television show, How I Met Your Mother in the episode "Slapsgiving 2: Revenge of the Slap" where she portrayed the 11-year-old version of Lily Aldrin. Her last role was in a 2014 episode of The Fosters.

Filmography

Film/television credits

References

External links

Living people
Actresses from Texas
American child actresses
American film actresses
American television actresses
21st-century American actresses
Year of birth missing (living people)